Bruce Tempany (born 22 December 1958) is a former Australian rules footballer who played with Richmond in the Victorian Football League (VFL).

Tempany debut in 1977, playing mostly as a half back flanker. He appeared in 40 of a possible 44 games in the 1978 and 1979 seasons, before he played finals football for the first time in 1980. Recruited from Essex Heights, Tempany was on the interchange bench in the 1982 VFL Grand Final.

References

External links 

1958 births
Living people
Richmond Football Club players
Australian rules footballers from Melbourne
People from Malvern, Victoria